Dinopteryx is an extinct genus of prehistoric bony fish that lived during the Santonian.

See also

 Prehistoric fish
 List of prehistoric bony fish

References

Beryciformes
Late Cretaceous fish
Prehistoric ray-finned fish genera